Timothy E. Gregory (born ) is an American historian and scholar, specializing in the Byzantine empire and classical archaeology. He has authored or co-authored numerous high-profile books on Byzantine topics and Christianity in the early period.

Background and field of expertise
He graduated with a PhD in 1972 from the University of Michigan, where he studied under Byzantine historian Paul Alexander and Roman historian John W. Eadie. He joined the Ohio State University in 1978, where he has taught in the Department of History ever since. He is fluent in Greek.

Gregory was one of several notable scholars who in the 1970s were of vital influence into the evolution of the studying of the Late Antiquity period, drawing on complex early texts and analysing them in detail and publishing his findings.  He has conducted detailed research into early Christianity, numismatics, epigraphy and wider socio-economic customs and many others during this period, covering Ancient Rome, Greece and Turkey. Gregory has also served as director of the Ohio State University Excavations at Isthmia and Co-Director of the Eastern Korinthia Archaeological Survey.

Publications
One of his earliest books, Vox Populi, first published in 1979, explores religious tension and violence in the 5th century in Ancient Greece and the Middle East.  Other notable books include Panathenaia: Studies in Athenian life and thought in the classical age (1979), A social history of Philippi in the first century (1988), The soteriology of Clement of Rome within the intellectual matrix (1988),  Archaeology and oligarchy at Isthmia (1989), The early Byzantine empresses and the Orthodox Church (1990), The sanctuary at Epidauros and cult-based networking in the Greek world of the fourth century B.C. (1992)  and Greek and Indian mercantile communities of the diaspora (1993), Hellenic religion and Christianization, c. 370–529, (2001) and The Lives of Peter the Iberian, Theodosius of Jerusalem (2008). In 2005 he first published an important general history work entitled A History of Byzantium, published in its second edition in 2010. His articles related to Ancient Rome and Greece have also been published in notable publications ; of major note was his essay, Survival of Paganism in Christian Greece: A Critical Essay, published in 1986 by the American Journal of Philology.

References

1951 births
American Byzantinists
Classical archaeologists
University of Michigan alumni
Ohio State University faculty
Living people
Scholars of Byzantine history